American singer Ne-Yo has released nine studio albums, forty-one singles and several other appearances with other artists.

In 2006, Ne-Yo's debut album, In My Own Words, debuted at number one on the Billboard 200 in the United States. His second single, "So Sick", reached number one on the Billboard Hot 100; it was also Ne-Yo's first UK number-one single. The album was certified platinum by the Recording Industry Association of America in the US and gold by the British Phonographic Industry in the UK. Ne-Yo's second album, Because of You, was released in May 2007; it debuted at number one in the US and number six in the UK. The first single, "Because of You", peaked at number two in the US and number four in the UK. The album was certified platinum in the US and silver in the UK.

Ne-Yo's third album, Year of the Gentleman, was released in September 2008 and debuted at number two in both the US and the UK. The first single, "Closer", became Ne-Yo's second UK number-one single and peaked at number seven in the US. Year of the Gentleman was certified platinum in the US. In September 2009, Ne-Yo released his first greatest hits album, Ne-Yo: The Collection, in Japan.

Albums

Studio albums

Compilation albums

Singles

As lead artist

As featured artist

Promotional singles

Other charted songs

Guest appearances

Production discography

2006
Jay-Z - Kingdom Come
10. "Hollywood" 
 
Beyoncé - B'Day
07. "Flaws and All 
09. "Irreplaceable" 
18. "If"

2007
Rihanna - Good Girl Gone Bad
 06. "Hate That I Love You" 
 11. "Question Existing" 
 12. "Good Girl Gone Bad"

2008
Jennifer Hudson - Jennifer Hudson
01. "Spotlight"
09. "Can't Stop The Rain" 
Leona Lewis - Spirit
10. "I'm You" 
The Pussycat Dolls - Doll Domination
08. "Happily Never After" 
Paula DeAnda - Paula DeAnda
02. "Walk Away (Remember Me)" 
Lindsay Lohan - Non-album single
00. "Bossy"
Janet Jackson - Discipline
9. "Can't B Good" 
20 "Discipline" 
Usher - Here I Stand
12. "His Mistakes" 
John Legend - Evolver
10. "Take Me Away" 
14. "Floating Away"

2009
Rihanna - Rated R
04. "Stupid in Love" 
06. "Russian Roulette" 
Chrisette Michele - Epiphany
03. "What You Do" 
Letoya Luckett - Lady Love
03. "Not Anymore" 
J. Holiday - Round 2
04. "Don't Go" 
Mary J. Blige - Stronger With Each Tear
04. "Good Love" 
05. "I Feel Good"

2010
Sugababes - Sweet 7
10. "No More You" 
Raheem Devaughn – The Love & War MasterPeace
04. "I Don't Care" 
Jessica Sanchez – Me, You and the Music
07. "Plastic Roses" 
W-inds - Another World
10. "Truth (Saigo no Shinjitsu)"

2011
Kelly Rowland – Here I Am
11. "Heaven & Earth" 
Jennifer Hudson – I Remember Me
08. "Why Is It So Hard"

2012
Estelle - All of Me
15. "Do My Thing" 
Luke James - Luke James
05. "Make Love to Me"

2013
Mack Wilds - New York: A Love Story
04. "Own It" 
Celine Dion - Loved Me Back to Life
08. "Thank You"

2015
'Empire Cast - Empire: Original Soundtrack Season 2 Volume 106. "No Doubt About It" (Jussie Smollett and Pitbull)
07. "Ain't About the Money" (Jussie Smollett and Bryshere Y. Gray)
08. "Never Live Again" (Jussie Smollett)
11. "Heavy" (Jussie Smollett) 

2016Empire Cast - Empire: Original Soundtrack Season 2 Volume 204. "Shine on Me" (Jussie Smollett and Bre-Z)
11. "My Own Thang" (Jussie Smollett and Bre-Z)
20. "Never Let It Die"

2017La'Porsha Renae - Already All Ready07. "Somebody Does"

2018En Vogue - Electric Café''03. "Rocket" 

 Music videos 
 As lead artist 

 As featured artist 

 Notes 

ReferencesGeneral 
 
 Specific'''

External links
 Official website
 Ne-Yo at Musicbrainz

Discographies of American artists
Pop music discographies
Rhythm and blues discographies
Discography